Stone Horizons may refer to:

 Stone Horizons (1956 film), an Argentine film
 Stone Horizons (1953 film), a Croatian film